Ningbo Huamao International School (NBHIS), previously known as Multicultural Education Academy (MEA), is a school for international, expatriate students and Chinese nationals in Yinzhou district, Ningbo, Zhejiang, China. 

The school first opened its doors in 2006 on the grounds of Huamao Foreign Language School. It is located in the Yinzhou District, near Wanda Plaza and the University of Nottingham Ningbo Campus.

NBHIS has 450 students and over 150 faculty members from over 35 countries. NBHIS is affiliated with the larger Huamao Foreign Language School, a 5,000-student all-through school.

The school is co-educational and open to both boarding and day students. NBHIS offers three International Baccalaureate programmes PYP, MYP and DP. In October 2015 the school became a member of the Round Square Conference of Schools following Board approval at the global conference held at United World College of South East Asia (UWSEA).

History
Huamao Group purchased the "international school" from Denise Bradford in 2006. The school was originally known as the Australian International School Ningbo, then Huamao Multicultural Education Academy (MEA), and is now known as Ningbo Huamao International School due to a government license change that allows NBHIS to accept Chinese nationals alongside foreign nationals.

It once had up to 40 students, but by early 2008, it had shrunk to eight paying students. During that year, Hua Mao sought a "western partner" to assist in the management of MEA. The school signed a joint venture agreement with Mowbray International in 2008 to manage it jointly. Paul Stephens arrived as interim principal in early 2008. Stephens remained at Hua Mao until September 2008, when the agreement was signed. Ivan Moore was the founding principal when he arrived in December 2008.

The school's facilities have improve regularly as a result of consistent renovations. The school has built two new reception areas, a dance drama studio, a music suite and auditorium, a staff room, a library and a reading room, a home economics room, soft play areas, and indoor and outdoor play areas, as well as a new primary kitchen and dining room and an adventure playground in 2015. Classrooms are well-equipped, with internet access, data projectors, and computers. In 2017, the extensive MYP/DP library and an arts suite of art, music, design, drama, and music specialist classrooms were opened in the adjacent administrative building. As the school grows, more renovations are planned for 2018-19.

The Hua Mao campus includes two stadiums, an indoor swimming pool, three large auditoriums seating 300 to 500 people, a $10 million art gallery designed by Wang Shu, and a five-story science museum with a cinema seating 260 people.

During the school's early development, the three goals were to "make it safe, fun, and academically rigorous." The school's vision emphasizes the importance of blending Eastern and Western curriculum, ideas, and trends so that all students can learn from one another.

Principals

Governance
Until May 2012, NBHIS (as MEA) was governed as a joint venture by Huamao Education Group and Mowbray International. In June of that year, Hua Mao Education Group took over full operational control of MEA. The principal is appointed as CEO and reports to Huamao Group Chairman Xu Wanmao.

Boarding
While the majority of the students are day students, some students in the primary school board at NBHIS. They have lessons with Chinese teachers in the afternoons and two boarding mistresses in the evenings. Middle and senior school students board in the International Department Boarding House with Huamao Foreign Language School. In the evenings, senior students study in the MYP/DP library.

Curriculum
Bilingual education is a cornerstone of NBHIS education. Three people teach kindergarten classes: a foreign teacher, a Chinese teacher, and an assistant. Classes maximize students' opportunities to learn English and Chinese. Expats and Chinese IB experienced and trained teachers teach senior school classes.

Students at NBHIS begin in a bilingual pre-school environment, progress to primary school, where English is the primary language of instruction but includes strong stand-alone Chinese instruction, and then to middle school, where students continue to develop English as their primary language of instruction while protecting and extending their mother tongue. Students in the Diploma Program study English. Much of the bilingual education model follows the advice of Professor Ofelia Garcia of the City University of New York. 

NBHIS launched an iPad program in 2011 as part of its efforts to help students transition to a 21st-century economy and learn 21st-century skills. All middle and high school students bring their own laptop computers, which is required as they engage in research and technology-based education practices. IT is explicitly taught as part of an inquiry-based curriculum. In 2013, an English Language Centre opened, followed by a Learning Support program in 2014.

NBHIS is an International Baccalaureate World School, offering Primary Years Program (PYP) and Diploma Program (DP). Authorization for the PYP and DP programs was awarded in May 2012, and the school is a candidate for the Middle Years Programme (MYP).

References

External links 

 Ningbo Huamao International School 
 www.nbhis.com

International Baccalaureate schools in China
Education in Ningbo
Private schools in China
University of Nottingham
International schools in China
High schools in Zhejiang
Educational institutions established in 2006
Round Square schools
2006 establishments in China